Bony Dashaco (born Boniface Abayo Dashaco on 1 December 1976),  is a Cameroonian businessman, Chairman of the African Center for Marketing, Advertising and Research (ACMAR) media group

In  2014, he was nominated as an "African leader of tomorrow" by the  Institut Choiseul for International Politics and Geoeconomics as a person below the age of 40 who has impacted society. In October 2016, Institut Choiseul ranked him #36 on the list of top 100 African managers below the age of 40.

Career
 Dashaco is the president and founder of Médiafrique, an affiliate of ACMAR International. The media company is preset in 22 African countries and has created over 1000 direct jobs. He was nominated in the 2016 Ranking of 50 Most Influential Young  Cameroonians by the Center for Entrepreneurship, Leadership and Business Management Development (CELBMD) Africa. In 2016, he was  interviewed  by  France News Network Africa 24 with a special focus on Africa to highlight the development of media in Africa, and its problems and solutions.

In March 2016, the United States embassy in Cameroon visited Acmar group in Douala and had an interview with the group president based on US foreign policy in Cameroon.

Dashaco was named one of Institut Choiseul for International Politics and Geoeconomics's list of 100 future economic leaders of Africa.

In 2021, he launched three TV channels Dash TV, Dash Info and Dash Sports & entertainment.

Personal life
Dashaco is married and has two children.

See also 
Media of Cameroon

References

1978 births
Cameroonian businesspeople
Living people